Pig in a Poke is a 1977 Australian series about a Melbourne doctor who moves to Redfern. There was a 1974 one-off drama, and a subsequent series of five episodes in 1977.

References

External links
Pig in a Poke at IMDb

Australian Broadcasting Corporation original programming
1970s Australian television miniseries
1977 Australian television series debuts
1977 Australian television series endings